"Call Me" is a song by the American new wave band Blondie and the theme to the 1980 film American Gigolo. Produced and composed by Italian musician Giorgio Moroder, with lyrics by Blondie singer Debbie Harry, the song appeared in the film and was released in the United States in early 1980 as a single. "Call Me" was No. 1 for six consecutive weeks on the Billboard Hot 100 chart, where it became the band's biggest single and second No. 1. It also hit No. 1 in the UK and Canada, where it became their fourth and second chart-topper, respectively. In the year-end chart of 1980, it was Billboards No. 1 single and RPM magazine's No. 3 in Canada.

Record World called it a "stirring electronic dance cut."

Composition and recording
"Call Me" was composed by Italian disco producer Giorgio Moroder as the main theme song of the 1980 film American Gigolo. It is played in the key of D minor. Moroder originally asked Stevie Nicks from Fleetwood Mac to perform a song for the soundtrack, but she was prevented because of a recently signed contract with Modern Records. Moroder turned to Debbie Harry of Blondie, presenting Harry with an instrumental track called "Man Machine". Harry was asked to write the lyrics, a process that Harry states took a mere few hours. The lyrics were written from the perspective of the main character in the film, a male prostitute. 

Harry said the lyrics were inspired by her visual impressions from watching the film and that "When I was writing it, I pictured the opening scene, driving on the coast of California." The completed song was then recorded by the band, with Moroder producing.

In 2014, keyboardist-composer Harold Faltermeyer remembered the recording process as having three main sections: first Moroder and his music crew recorded an instrumental version of the song at Westlake Recording Studios in Los Angeles, with the tape locked to SMPTE timecode so that it would synchronize with the film. Then the project moved to New York for the Blondie recording session, at which the band surprised Moroder by insisting they would play their own parts. Faltermeyer was engineering when Harry sang and Chris Stein played electric guitar. Stein's guitar and amplifier were buzzing and noisy, so his setup was repaired to get a clean recording. The band had difficulty locking to sync, so Moroder stopped the unfinished sessions to save time, and took the project back to Los Angeles to more quickly add the final parts with his own picked musicians, including a keyboard solo by Faltermeyer. On the American Gigolo soundtrack album, Blondie the band is credited only for vocals, with other credits naming Moroder's crew of Keith Forsey on drums/percussion and Faltermeyer on keyboards and arrangements. Faltermeyer said the band was angry about being replaced by session players, but the song turned out to be very successful, so they took it in stride. Blondie keyboard player Jimmy Destri was obligated to play Faltermeyer's solo in concerts.

Release
In the US, the song was released by three record companies: the longest version (at 8:06) on the soundtrack album by Polydor, the 7" and 12" on Blondie's label Chrysalis, and a Spanish-language 12" version, with lyrics by Buddy and Mary McCluskey, on the disco label Salsoul Records. The Spanish version, titled "Llámame", was meant for release in Mexico and some South American countries. This version was also released in the US and the UK and had its CD debut on Chrysalis/EMI's rarities compilation Blonde and Beyond (1993). In 1988, a remixed version by Ben Liebrand taken from the Blondie remix album Once More into the Bleach was issued as a single in the UK. In 2001, the "original long version" appeared as a bonus track on the Autoamerican album re-issue.

In 2014, Blondie re-recorded the song for their compilation album Greatest Hits Deluxe Redux. The compilation was part of a 2-disc set called Blondie 4(0) Ever which included their tenth studio album Ghosts of Download and marked the 40th anniversary of the forming of the band.

Harry recorded an abbreviated version of the song that was backed by the Muppet Band for her guest appearance on The Muppet Show in August 1980. It was first broadcast in January 1981.

Popularity and acclaim
The single was released in the United States in February 1980. It spent six consecutive weeks at number one and was certified Gold (for one million copies sold) by the RIAA. It also spent four weeks at No. 2 on the US dance chart. The single was also No. 1 on Billboard magazine's 1980 year-end chart. The song lists at No. 57 on Billboard's All Time Top 100. It was released in the UK two months later, where it became Blondie's fourth UK No. 1 single in little over a year. The song was also played on a British Telecom advert in the 1980s. 25 years after its original release, "Call Me" was ranked at No. 283 on the list of Rolling Stone's 500 Greatest Songs of All Time. In 1981, the Village Voice ranked "Call Me" as the third-best song of the year 1980 on its annual year-end critics' poll, Pazz & Jop. In 2017, Billboard ranked the song number three on their list of the 10 greatest Blondie songs, and in 2021, The Guardian ranked the song number four on their list of the 20 greatest Blondie songs. In 2022  the song was played as part of HBO's flagship show, WestWorld.

In 1981, the song was nominated for a Grammy Award for Best Rock Performance by a Duo or Group with Vocal, as well as for a Golden Globe for Best Original Song.

Music video
There were two videos made:
 One was clips and video footage of Debbie Harry in New York City. The video can be found on the 1991 UK video compilation The Complete Picture: The Very Best of Deborah Harry and Blondie.
 The other, which came out in 1981, did not feature any of the band. It depicted a New York City taxi driver (who had appeared in several other Blondie music videos) driving his Checker Taxi through Manhattan traffic. This version was part of the 1981 "Best of Blondie" compilation video.

Charts

Weekly charts

Year-end charts

End-of-decade charts

All-time charts

1988 Remix charts

Sales and certifications

Release history

1980 release
US, UK 7" (CHS 2414)
"Call Me (Theme from American Gigolo)" (7" edit) — 3:32
"Call Me" (7" instrumental) — 3:27

UK 12" (CHS 12 2414)
"Call Me" (7" edit) — 3:32
"Call Me" (Spanish version – 7" edit) — 3:32
"Call Me" (7" instrumental) — 3:27

US 12" (Polydor PRO 124) [promo only]
"Call Me" (Theme from American Gigolo) — 8:04
"Night Drive" (Reprise) - by Giorgio Moroder — 3:52

US 12" (Salsoul SG 341)
"Call Me" (Spanish version, extended) — 6:23
"Call Me" (Instrumental) — 6:10

1989 release
UK 7" (CHS 3342-1)
"Call Me" (Ben Liebrand Remix edit) — 3:48
"Call Me" (Original Version) — 3:31

UK 12" (CHS 12 3342)
"Call Me" (Ben Liebrand Remix) — 7:09
"Backfired" (Bruce Forrest And Frank Heller Remix) — 6:03
"Call Me" (Original Version) — 3:31

UK CD (CHSCD 3342)
"Call Me" (Ben Liebrand Remix) — 7:09
"Backfired" (Bruce Forrest And Frank Heller Remix) — 6:03
 Performed by Debbie Harry
"Call Me" (Original Version) — 3:31
"Hanging on the Telephone" — 2:23

Cover versions 
 In 2022, electronic dance music producers Gabry Ponte, R3hab and Timmy Trumpet released a cover of the song. It peaked at No. 80 on the Dutch Single Top 100.

See also
List of Billboard Hot 100 number-one singles of 1980

References

External links
Debbie Harry's isolated vocal track on YouTube
 

1979 songs
1980 singles
Blondie (band) songs
In This Moment songs
Century Media Records singles
Chrysalis Records singles
Dance-rock songs
Polydor Records singles
Song recordings produced by Giorgio Moroder
Songs about prostitutes
Songs about telephone calls
Songs written for films
Songs with feminist themes
Songs written by Giorgio Moroder
Billboard Hot 100 number-one singles
Cashbox number-one singles
RPM Top Singles number-one singles
UK Singles Chart number-one singles
Macaronic songs